James Christopher Gaffigan (born July 7, 1966) is an American stand-up comedian, actor, writer, and producer. His material often addresses fatherhood, laziness, food, religion, and general observations. He is regarded as a "clean" comic, using little profanity in his routines. He has released several successful comedy specials, including Mr. Universe, Obsessed, Cinco, and Quality Time, all of which have received Grammy nominations.

Gaffigan's memoir Dad Is Fat (2013) and his most recent book Food: A Love Story (2014) were both published by Crown Publishers. He co-created and starred in the TV Land series The Jim Gaffigan Show, based on his life. He collaborates extensively with his wife, actress Jeannie Gaffigan, with whom he has five children. They are Catholic, a topic that frequently comes up in his comedy shows.

Early life
James Christopher Gaffigan was born in Elgin, Illinois,  on July 7, 1966, the youngest of six children born to charity worker and fundraiser Marcia Miriam (née Mitchell) and banker Michael Ambrose Gaffigan. He is of Irish descent, with his family's surname originally being Gavahan. His maternal grandfather was Iowa Supreme Court Justice Richard F. Mitchell. Gaffigan was raised in Chesterton, Indiana, and often jokes about growing up in a large family. His mother was accomplished at needlework and received a national award for original design and craftsmanship from the American Needlepoint Guild in 1985. She died of cancer in 1990, aged 53.

Gaffigan's father was the president and CEO of the Mercantile National Bank of Indiana for 15 years until his retirement in 1991. A former seminarian, he was also actively involved in local charity work. He died of lung cancer in 1999. Gaffigan's father was the first in his family to attend college, and encouraged his children to seek careers that promised job security. However, at about the age of five, Gaffigan announced that he wanted to be an actor when he grew up.

As a teenager, Gaffigan watched Saturday Night Live. He attended La Lumiere School in La Porte, Indiana, where he played on the school's football team. He attended Purdue University for one year, where he was a member of the Phi Gamma Delta fraternity, before transferring to Georgetown University's McDonough School of Business, where he graduated in 1988 with a degree in finance. He played football at Georgetown and Purdue. Although he hated studying finance, he worked as a litigation consultant for a short time after graduating and "was horrible at it".

Career

Stand-up

Gaffigan moved to New York in 1990 to pursue comedy, a move that was inspired by his admiration for fellow Hoosier David Letterman. He found a job in advertising, and he would work during the day and take acting classes at night. During this time, he was cast in Blockbuster Video's "Entertainment Squad" series of commercials. His career began in earnest when a friend from the class dared him to take a stand-up seminar that required a live set at the end.  He fell in love with stand-up, and began to play comedy clubs nightly—after his evening acting classes—until the wee hours of the morning. He was often found sleeping on the job; his boss had to wake him up to fire him.

For the first seven years of his career, he tried various styles, ranging from angry comedy to impressions and voices. Also, live comedy was in decline following its peak of the 1980s, further affected by the increased popularity of cable television.  After periodically auditioning for The Late Show with David Letterman for six years, he then had a successful stand-up routine on the show in 1999, and his career took off.

Gaffigan's style is largely observational, and his principal topics relate to laziness, eating, and parenthood.  He is famous for his Hot Pocket routine, which was inspired by a commercial he saw that he mistook for a Saturday Night Live sketch.  Also, during his routines, he will sometimes perform soliloquies by using a high-pitched voice and—in the third-person—deliver negative feedback on his own performance, such as after making a diarrhea joke in his 2012 special "Mr. Universe" using the voice and saying "Really, he’s using diarrhea jokes?" He says "that inside voice is my connection with the audience".

In an interview with the Duluth News-Tribune, he explained that the voice was developed over time, beginning as a teenager when he would disarm people by talking for them in their presence.  He also used it as a way to fend off hecklers earlier in his career, when he says that comedy clubs were more combative. He cursed early in his career, and he added cursing to his comedy album Doing My Time, at the request of his label, in the hopes of drawing more teenagers. However, he has largely removed profanity from his routine, as he feels that his subject matter doesn't lend itself to cursing and that it reduced the effort he put into crafting his jokes.

In 2004, Gaffigan's stand-up material was featured in Comedy Central's animated series Shorties Watchin' Shorties. In October 2005, he filmed a live Comedy Central special that aired for the following January, and became the comedy album/DVD Beyond the Pale.  The routine consisted primarily of material regarding food and American eating habits, and the comedian unknowingly predicted a future menu item at Dunkin Donuts—the 'glazed donut breakfast sandwich'—while commenting on the future of America's eating habits. His 2009 album King Baby was also a television special filmed in Austin, Texas, at the end of his "The Sexy Tour." Comedy Central released King Baby on DVD. In a March 2009 interview on Anytime with Bob Kushell, Gaffigan defended his naming of the tour, stating that he thought it would be funny that parents would be unsure about whether to bring their teenage children to the show. Four years later, on March 14, 2013, Gaffigan was named the "King of Clean" by the Wall Street Journal.

On February 25, 2012, Gaffigan taped a one-hour stand-up special—Mr. Universe—at the Warner Theater in Washington, D.C.; it was nominated for a Grammy. He announced that, based on the business model used by Louis C.K.'s Live at the Beacon Theater, the stand-up would be available online through his website for $5, with 20% of the total proceeds going to the Bob Woodruff Foundation, an organization that provides support to military veterans.  In 2012, he was among the top-ten grossing comics in the US, according to Pollstar.

Gaffigan filmed his 2014 comedy special titled Jim Gaffigan: Obsessed at Boston's Wilbur Theater on January 18, 2014. Obsessed premiered on Comedy Central on April 27 becoming the most watched stand-up comedy special of the year for the network. The accompanying album, also titled Obsessed, debuted at number 11 on the Billboard 200 and number 1 on the Billboard Comedy Album charts. 2015 saw him embark on a headlining tour, culminating in a winter show at Madison Square Garden.

Gaffigan has performed stand-up to support charitable causes as well. In 2002, he was part of a United Service Organization event at Guantanamo Bay Naval Base. Gaffigan performed at the 2013 Stand Up for Heroes charity event benefitting the Bob Woodruff Foundation alongside fellow stand-up comedians Jerry Seinfeld, Bill Cosby and Jon Stewart.  Gaffigan also performed at the 2013 CNN Heroes event, which celebrates everyday heroes doing extraordinary work around the world.  In May 2014, Gaffigan performed at the Make It Right Gala, an organization founded by Brad Pitt, which builds sustainable homes and buildings for communities in need. On September 26, 2015, he performed at the Festival of Families, a Catholic event held in Philadelphia. Gaffigan was the only comedian on the bill at the festival, and the event was visited by Pope Francis. The event had more than one million attendees.

As of June 2016, Gaffigan was the most popular comic on all of Pandora.com with over 647 million spins.

In 2016, Gaffigan embarked on his Fully Dressed Tour, performing in the United States, Canada, and the UK.

Gaffigan has appeared at the "Just for Laughs" comedy festival in Montreal, Quebec, numerous times.

Influences
Gaffigan credits David Letterman and Bill Murray as influences, and he has asserted that Richard Pryor was the greatest stand-up comedian ever. His comedy mentor was Dave Attell, who he asserted was the only person who thought he was funny in his early stand-up years.

On the episode of Comedians in Cars Getting Coffee which featured Gaffigan, he admitted that the show's host Jerry Seinfeld was a big influence for him.

Reception
Gaffigan is widely noted for being an everyman and a clean comic, and signature routines regard Hot Pockets, cake, and bacon.  His tendency to avoid profanity has drawn mixed responses from audiences and critics.  One critic compared him to Full House-era Bob Saget (who starred in the 1990s family show), which Gaffigan took as an insult.  However, Hampton Stevens in The Atlantic wrote that the comic champions "a vital element to standup that [Lenny] Bruce had taken away—the indispensable, but apparently forgotten idea that comedians have no obligation to be provocative, topical, socially conscious, or anything else but funny".

Acting

As Gaffigan's comedy career stalled in the 1990s, a friend suggested he audition for commercials, a move that turned out to be profitable. He has appeared in over 200 TV commercials, ranging from Rolling Rock to Saturn to Chrysler and ESPN. His ubiquity earned him the title of 'Salesman of the Year' by BusinessWeek in 1999. He also performed in a trio of Sierra Mist commercials for the 2007 Super Bowl as part of the Sierra Mist comedy ensemble "The Mis-Takes".  He appeared in an ad series for Sierra Mist alongside fellow comedian Michael Ian Black.

After his first appearance on The Late Show with David Letterman in 1999, Gaffigan was tapped by the host to develop a sitcom called Welcome to New York in which he also co-starred alongside Christine Baranski. The show was cancelled after its first season despite receiving positive reviews. During the 2000/2001 television season, he was a cast member of The Ellen Show on CBS, Ellen DeGeneres's second sitcom. He appeared in two movies chosen for the 2001 Sundance Film Festival: Super Troopers and 30 Years to Life. He appeared on That '70s Show. He was a regular cast member of the TBS original sitcom My Boys. He left the show at the end of the third season.

In 2008, he appeared in the movie The Love Guru starring Mike Myers.

In 2009, Gaffigan guest starred as the best friend of Murray Hewitt in one episode of the HBO comedy series Flight of the Conchords. Later that same year, he appeared in the Sam Mendes-directed dramedy Away We Go and the teen comedy 17 Again. On June 11, 2009, Gaffigan appeared on The Tonight Show with Conan O'Brien. He appeared on Law & Order episodes "Flight" and "Reality Bites", as well as an episode titled "Smile" on Law and Order: Criminal Intent.

He was in an episode of The Daily Show as a man posing as a Daily Show correspondent who knows nothing about the show (he refers to it as "The John Daily Show") and simply wants to be seen with Jon Stewart. This was meant to be a parody of the 2009 White House gatecrash incident.

Gaffigan appeared on Broadway in That Championship Season, which opened in March 2011, opposite Brian Cox, Chris Noth, Kiefer Sutherland, and Jason Patric. Gaffigan's performance was praised by ABC News correspondent Sandy Kenyon as the most moving and that he may "steal the show".  He called being on Broadway "an amazing experience, really hard but really fun".

Gaffigan starred in Shia LaBeouf's 2013 short film Howard Cantour.com, the content of which was later revealed to be mostly plagiarized from Daniel Clowes's 2007 graphic novella Justin M. Damiano.  Reflecting on the incident in an interview for The Daily Beast, Gaffigan said, "There's no greater sin in the stand-up world than thievery...So you do not want to be associated with thievery," but added, "I don't have any hard feelings about it because I don't think people think I had anything to do with it."

In the 2010s, Gaffigan, his wife, and Peter Tolan began to develop material for a show based loosely on their own life.  CBS agreed to shoot a pilot of their show in March 2013, with casting by Marc Hirschfeld, and Mira Sorvino playing his wife; but ultimately passed on the project. When the cable network TV Land began efforts to broadcast original material and attract younger audiences, it offered the Gaffigans complete creative control.  The result was The Jim Gaffigan Show, a sitcom about a couple raising their five kids in a two-bedroom New York City apartment.  After the release of two online-only episodes in June 2015, the pilot episode aired on July 15, 2015.  The show stars Gaffigan as a fictionalized version of himself, with his wife Jeannie played by Ashley Williams. Other characters include their real-estate agent (and Jeannie's best friend) Daniel (played by Michael Ian Black), Jim's fellow comic and best friend Dave (Adam Goldberg), and their priest, Father Nicholas (Tongayi Chirisa). After 2 seasons of the show, in 2016 Jim and his wife Jeannie decided not to continue with a third season so they could spend more time with their kids.

Gaffigan co-starred in the film Experimenter, a fictionalized account of the experiments of the Yale professor Stanley Milgram.  Gaffigan plays an actor hired to collaborate in the experiments.

In February 2016, Gaffigan began appearing in KFC commercials as Colonel Sanders, replacing Norm Macdonald.

Since April 8, 2016, Gaffigan has appeared with his family in a marketing campaign for the 2017 Chrysler Pacifica.

In October 2016, it was announced Gaffigan would be joining the cast of the third season of the anthology drama series, Fargo. However, he was ultimately forced to drop out due to scheduling difficulties; he was replaced by Mark Forward. In 2018, he portrayed Paul Markham in the biographical drama Chappaquiddick, starring Jason Clarke and Kate Mara, to positive reviews. Gaffigan next took on the lead role in the 2018 neo-noir film American Dreamer, which was released on September 20, 2019. Gaffigan's dark portrayal of a broken man driven to desperate actions was very well received by critics, with the Chicago Sun-Times review calling it "a career-best dramatic performance" by Gaffigan.

Gaffigan portrayed George Westinghouse in Michael Almereyda's 2020 film Tesla.

In 2020, Gaffigan was announced to provide the voice of Thunderbolt in season two of Stargirl. By season three, the role recast to Seth Green.

In January 2021, he joined the cast of Disney's Peter Pan & Wendy as Mr. Smee. In 2021, Gaffigan voiced Lorenzo Paguro in the Pixar film Luca.

Animation
Gaffigan is also notable for his voice-over work. He voiced an animated version of himself on Pale Force with Conan O'Brien from 2005 to 2008. He has also voiced characters on the animated shows Bob's Burgers, Shorty McShorts' Shorts, WordGirl, Star vs. the Forces of Evil, and the animated feature Duck Duck Goose.

Writing

Gaffigan produced a series of animated shorts for Late Night with Conan O'Brien, titled Pale Force (2005–2008).  The animated sketches featured Gaffigan and O'Brien as superheroes who fight crime with their extremely pale skin. The series was nominated for a Daytime Emmy in 2007 in the category of "Outstanding Broadband Program – Comedy".

Gaffigan's humorous quips have earned him over two and a half million followers on Twitter. He was listed by Rolling Stone as one of the "25 funniest people on Twitter" in 2012.

In 2013, Gaffigan released Dad Is Fat, a title derived from the first complete sentence his eldest son wrote on a dry-erase board at the age of four or five.  "He showed it to me," Gaffigan recalled in an interview, "and I laughed, and then I put him up for adoption."  The book is a collection of essays dealing with the raising of his children, as well as reminiscences from his own childhood.  In support of the volume, he appeared on NPR's Weekend Edition, ABC's The View, and MSNBC's Morning Joe, spoke at BEA in New York, embarked on a nine-stop bus tour that ended on Father's Day.

It debuted at number five on The New York Times Best Seller's list, remaining on the list for three months. The book received tepid reviews from critics.  Kirkus Reviews said of the book that it's "hardly groundbreaking comedy material, but the book will appeal to Gaffigan's fans". Lou Harry of the Indianapolis Business Journal said that while "no new ground is broken in Jim Gaffigan's book...'Dad is Fat' should be a fun intermezzo in your summer reading pile."  Regarding the audiobook, which Gaffigan read, Audiofile said his "performance strikes the right balance between his near-deadpan comedy delivery and the energy needed to keep a beleaguered parent engaged".

Gaffigan signed with Crown Publishing in June 2013 to write a second book of comic essays. The book, Food: A Love Story, which was released in Fall 2014. Publishers Weekly said the book "packs plenty of laughs".  Kirkus Reviews remarked that "Gaffigan somehow manages to work 'clean' without ever becoming sickeningly saccharine," and that "laughs [are] served up just right on every page".  Of the accompanying audiobook, the Library Journal said, "The witty commentary is peppered with jokes and funny stories that will have listeners smiling throughout and occasionally laughing out loud."

Prior to meeting his wife, actress Jeannie Noth, Gaffigan largely wrote alone. However, while working on his first show, Welcome to New York, he was overwhelmed and asked for input from her (then his friend). Although initially hesitant to have a collaborator, as their relationship grew, so did Noth's ability to write material for him.  Once they married, she left behind her work with her youth theater project (Shakespeare on the Playground) to devote herself to raising their expanding brood, and after a joke she wrote drew big laughs at a show, she and Jim began to collaborate more.  She gradually transferred into the position of Jim's chief co-writer, and they are now full writing partners.  She has been a credited writer and/or executive producer on all his comedy endeavors since Beyond the Pale, including his two books and television show.  He also credits her with "coaching" him through his performance in That Championship Season.

Media appearances
Gaffigan participated on the NPR radio quiz program Wait Wait... Don't Tell Me! in 2013. Gaffigan is also a regular commentator on CBS Sunday Morning, for which he won a Daytime Emmy in 2016.

Personal life
Gaffigan married actress Jeannie Gaffigan (née Noth) in 2003. They have two daughters and three sons together. The family of seven lived in a two-bedroom apartment in the Manhattan borough of New York City, before moving to a larger Manhattan home in 2015. To stay connected to his family, Gaffigan tries to "maintain bedtime rituals while working in the city". When on tour, he reportedly takes his family with him.

Gaffigan is a practicing Catholic who avoids working on Sundays, though he has joked that his wife is so much more devout than him that she seems like a "Shiite Catholic" in comparison. He and his family attend Mass at St. Patrick's Old Cathedral in Manhattan, which is also where he and his wife were married and where their children were baptized. In May 2016, he and his wife delivered the commencement address at the Catholic University of America. They also delivered the commencement address at his wife's alma mater, Marquette University, in May 2018. They were both awarded an honorary Doctor of Humane Letters degree as part of the graduation ceremony.

In 2019, Gaffigan apologised on social media after endorsing the racist "Moriori First" myth in one of his stand-up shows. A white supremacist conspiracy theory, the myth falsely claims Māori displaced the Moriori as the first people of New Zealand, and was used to justify white settler colonialism. Gaffigan also made disparaging remarks about Māori people, which were described as "offensive" and "ignorant" on New Zealand social media.

Discography
 2001: Luigi's Doghouse
 2001: Economics II
 2003: More Moo Moos
 2004: The Last Supper
 2004: Doing My Time
 2006: Beyond the Pale
 2009: King Baby
 2012: Mr. Universe
 2014: Obsessed
 2017: Cinco
 2018: Noble Ape
 2019: Quality Time
 2020: The Pale Tourist
 2021:  Comedy Monster

Filmography

Film

Television
{| class="wikitable sortable"
|-
! Year
! Title
! Role
! class="unsortable"| Notes
|-
|rowspan=2| 1998
| Soul Man
| Keats 
| Episode: "Raising Heck"
|-
| Dr. Katz, Professional Therapist
| Jim 
| Episode: "Old Man"
|-
| 1998, 2009
| Law & Order
| Larry Johnson / George Rozakis 
| 2 episodes
|-
| 1998
| Conrad Bloom
| Oliver 
| Episode: "How Florrie Got Her Groove Back"
|-
| 1999
| LateLine
| The Del-Ex Kid 
| Episode: "Pearce on Conan"
|-
|rowspan=3| 2000
| Third Watch
| Portis 
| Episode: "Journey to the Himalayas"
|-
| Comedy Central Presents
| Jim Gaffigan
| 1 episode
|-
| Cry Baby Lane
| Dan 
| Television film
|-
| 2000–01
| Welcome to New York
| Jim Gaffigan
| 13 episodes
|-
|rowspan=2| 2001
| Law & Order: Special Victims Unit
| Oliver Tunney
| Episode: "Countdown"
|-
| Sex and the City
| Doug 
| Episode: "Defining Moments"
|-
| 2001–02
| The Ellen Show
| Rusty Carnouk
| 18 episodes
|-
| 2002
| Law & Order: Criminal Intent
| Marty Palin / Russell Matthews 
| 2 episodes
|-
| 2003
| Hope & Faith
| Brad 
| Episode: "Anger Management"
|-
|rowspan=2| 2003–04
| Ed
| Toby Gibbons
| 4 episodes
|-
| That '70s Show
| Roy Keene
| 7 episodes
|-
|rowspan=3| 2004
| Bad Apple
| Butters
| rowspan="2"|Television film
|-
| Strip Search
| Reverend Craig Peterson
|-
| The Jury
| Mr. Nifco 
| Episode: "Mail Order Mystery"
|-
| 2005
| Cheap Seats
| Jerome Block 
| Episode: "Gimmick Sports"
|-
|rowspan=2| 2006
| Love, Inc.
| Jamie
| Episode: "Anything But Love"
|-
| Shorty McShorts' Shorts
| Og, Henrichven
| Episode: "My Mom Married A Yeti"
|-
| 2006–09
| My Boys| Andy Franklin
| 40 episodes
|-
|rowspan=2| 2009
| Flight of the Conchords| Jim 
| Episode: "Murray Takes It to the Next Level"
|-
| WordGirl| Mr. Dudley (voice)
| 3 episodes
|-
| 2010
| Bored to Death| Drug Counsellor 
| Episode: "Super Ray Is Mortal!"
|-
| 2011
| Royal Pains| Pete Stanbleck
| Episode: "Astraphobia"
|-
| 2012–13
| Portlandia| Donald
| 2 episodes
|-
| 2013–17
| Bob's Burgers| Henry Haber (voice)
| 3 episodes
|-
| 2014
| Us & Them| Theo
| 2 episodes
|-
| 2015
| Wallykazam!| Mr. Trollman
| Episode: "Rock and Troll"
|-
| 2015–19
| Star vs. the Forces of Evil| Father Time / additional voices
| 3 episodes
|-
| 2015–16
| The Jim Gaffigan Show| Himself
| 23 episodes; co-creator
|-
|rowspan=2| 2017
| Unbreakable Kimmy Schmidt| Officer Krupke
| Episode: "Kimmy Bites an Onion!"
|-
|| Gilbert|Himself
|Documentary
|-
| 2019
| Scooby-Doo and Guess Who?| Himself (voice)
| Episode: "The Fastest Fast Food Fiend!"
|-
| 2021
| Stargirl| Thunderbolt (voice)
| 2 episodes
|-
| 2021
| Rick and Morty| Hoovy (voice)
| Episode: "Mort Dinner Rick Andre"
|-
|2022
|Reindeer in Here|Santa Claus (voice)
| Television special
|-
| TBA
| Full Circle|
| Upcoming miniseries
|}

Awards and nominations

On April 26, 2014, Gaffigan received the award for Concert Comedian at the American Comedy Awards for his work.

In 2007, Pale Force was nominated for a Daytime Emmy for Outstanding Broadband Program in the Comedy category. Gaffigan served as executive producer, writer, and lead actor.

In 2016, he won the Daytime Emmy Award for Outstanding Morning Program for his contributions as a commentator to CBS Sunday Morning''.

Grammy Awards
The Grammy Awards are awarded annually by the National Academy of Recording Arts and Sciences. Gaffigan has been nominated seven times.

References

External links

 
 
 
 
 

1966 births
20th-century American male actors
21st-century American male actors
20th-century American comedians
21st-century American comedians
American male film actors
American male television actors
American stand-up comedians
American people of Irish descent
Catholics from Illinois
Catholics from Indiana
Comedians from Illinois
Comedians from Indiana
Georgetown Hoyas football players
Georgetown University alumni
La Lumiere School alumni
Living people
McDonough School of Business alumni
Male actors from Indiana
People from Elgin, Illinois
People from Chesterton, Indiana
People from La Porte, Indiana
Purdue Boilermakers football players
Purdue University alumni